The Believers is a 1987 Canadian-American crime thriller horror film directed by John Schlesinger, starring Martin Sheen, Robert Loggia and Helen Shaver. It is based on the 1982 novel The Religion by Nicholas Conde.

Plot
After his wife Lisa dies from an accidental electrocution, psychologist Cal Jamison relocates with his young son, Chris, from Minneapolis to New York City, where Cal begins working as a police psychologist for the New York City Police Department. The city has been plagued by a series of brutal, ritualistic child murders. The first victim is a young boy found murdered in an abandoned movie theater. A policeman named Tom Lopez frantically phones in the discovery of the body, and claims the crimes are being committed by members of a Hispanic cult practicing a malevolent version of brujería. Cal is appointed to examine Tom, who raves about the cult's powerful leader.

A second victim is found eviscerated on a makeshift altar beneath a dock in Staten Island. Cal begins to inquire about brujería to Carmen, his housekeeper and nanny, who practices a benevolent form of it, leaving protection charms in the apartment for Cal and Chris. The following day, Tom, paranoid and being followed by mysterious men, stabs himself to death in a diner. Later, Cal and his new girlfriend, Jessica, attend a party where a mysterious Caribbean man, Palo, attempts to steal a necklace from Jessica; shortly before, Jessica had left her compact in the bathroom, and unbeknownst to Jessica, Palo rubs the pad with his fingers. When Cal returns home, he finds Carmen performing a ritual on Chris, and angrily throws her out of the house, despite the fact that she assures him she is attempting to protect him.

Chris accompanies his affluent Aunt Kate and Uncle Dennis on a trip to stay at their country home. Meanwhile, Cal and Jessica consult Oscar Sezine, a friend of Tom's, who believes the cult is planning a ritualized murder for the summer solstice in four days time. Oscar performs a purification ritual in an attempt to ensure the safety of Chris, whom he worries may be targeted as a sacrifice for the solstice. The next morning, Jessica finds a boil on her face and falls ill. Before departing to reunite with Kate, Dennis, and Chris in the country, Cal receives a frantic phone call from police lieutenant Sean McTaggert. Cal arrives at McTaggert's apartment, finding it in disarray, and McTaggert seated with a gun, rambling in a paranoid manner. He shows Cal a photo and secret file he uncovered documenting elite businessman Robert Calder's ritual murder of his own son. Cal leaves with the file at McTaggert's insistence. After he leaves, McTaggert commits suicide.

Meanwhile, Jessica has a panic attack after the boil on her face bursts and baby spiders break free from the wound. While Cal tends to Jessica in the hospital, Kate leaves him a voice message that she has changed her plans and is going to return Chris to him, but the message is cut short. Unaware Kate has called, Cal departs the hospital with his friend Marty, who drives him to Kate and Dennis's country house. Upon arriving, Dennis tells Cal that Kate has gone to a 24-hour grocery store. In the living room, Dennis recounts he and Kate's travels to the Sudan when Kate was a graduate student, and how they witnessed the power of a human sacrifice after allowing their gravely ill son to be sacrificed to end a drought. Palo and Calder then enter the room, along with a number of other cultists, urging Cal to join, and stating that Chris has been predestined to become a sacrifice.

Cal flees the house through an upstairs window after finding Chris no longer in his room. In the boathouse, Cal finds Kate's dead body before he is knocked unconscious by Palo. Cal is driven to an abandoned factory, where Chris's ritual murder is to be carried out among the cult. Cal thwarts the sacrifice by stabbing Dennis to death, and Marty, who followed them to the warehouse, comes to Cal's aid, shooting various cultists  from an upper landing. Calder abducts Chris and the two ascend to the top of the warehouse in a freight elevator. Marty is incapacitated with a blowpipe dart by Palo, but not before he severely burns Palo's face, blinding him. Cal manages to chase Calder into a storage room, stabbing him to death before retrieving Chris. Cal puts Chris down and a blinded Palo attacks Cal, but falls off the scaffolding when Chris coaxes him toward him and is impaled on rebar below. Cal carries Chris and they escape from the warehouse.

Some time later, Cal, Jessica and Chris are living happily on a farm in the country, and Jessica is pregnant. Following their barking dog to the barn, Cal investigates the barn loft and finds an altar adorned with religious icons, fresh produce, loaves of bread, and various sacrificed animals. Hearing sounds from below he sees Jessica has come in. She confesses to making the shrine saying "I did it for us. We'll be safe now." Cal stares in shock as the screen fades to black.

Cast

Analysis
Barna William Donovan notes that there were several Satanic-themed Hollywood films in the 1970s. Citing as examples The Exorcist (1973) and The Omen film series (1976-1991). But he also noted that Hollywood seemed to have lost interest in the subject by the 1980s. He cites The Believers as one of only two noteworthy films about Devil worship created in the 1980s, the other one being Angel Heart (1987). Though he notes that Indiana Jones and the Temple of Doom (1984) also touched on the similar subject of a demon-worshiping cult, which abducts children and offers human sacrifices.

He points out that Angel Heart was a period piece set in the 1940s, and so fantastic that it limited its connections to the contemporary world of the 1980s "and its fundamentalist paranoias", while The Believers was set in that contemporary world. The villains were not, however, worshipers of the Judeo-Christian Satan. Instead they were practitioners of Santería, the legitimate Afro-Caribbean religion depicted in the film as "a cult of evil that condones human sacrifice". Neither film approached the subject of the 1980s hysteria over Satanic ritual abuse, a conspiracy theory which generated sensationalist headlines in this decade. Donovan concludes that Hollywood distanced itself from the subject matter, probably because child sexual abuse was deemed an unfit subject for popcorn entertainment.

According to John Kenneth Muir, the message of the film is that yuppies would do anything for success, including calling upon dark gods. Muir points similarities to The Possession of Joel Delaney (1972), as both films fear ethnicity. For example, in The Believers, a cleaning woman working for the Jamisons tries to protect Chris by using a benevolent version of Santeria. Cal fails to distinguish between good and evil magic and treats her as a threat. The film depicts Manhattan as a place where alien cultures merge and the Christian white man has reasons to fear the pagans, who may come for his children. As such, it plays on a fear for the ethnic, racial, and religious Other.

Roger Ebert complained that most films about Caribbean religions tend to involve "guys with blank eyes" and animal sacrifice, bloodthirsty cults, sadistic killers, and a quest for innocent blood; they never depict any positive aspect to these religions. He found this to be a prejudiced treatment.  He also complained that the film makes use of multiple ritualistic details (such as circles of ashes, blood, and charms), without ever bothering to explain their meaning. According to Mercedes Cros Sandoval, the film brought both public attention and negative publicity for Santería.

The film is more typical of its decade in the negative depiction of the upper class of New York City. The cultists turn out to be members of this social class which literally sacrifice their children in exchange for "fame, wealth, and power". Their success and upward mobility is based not on business acumen, but their practice of Santeria. Muir sees this as a literal interpretation of a familiar phrase, voodoo economics. 
Muir notes a few similarities with Rosemary's Baby (1968). An evil cult is depicted as active in a modern city, hiding in plain sight. And a couple of limousine liberal friends of the Jamisons are revealed to be cultists in their own right.

For Muir, the highlight of the film involves the depiction of a voodoo-like curse. Jessica Halliday (Helen Shaver) accidentally leaves her compact in a bathroom while snooping around in Calder's office. By the time she retrieves it, it has become a cursed item. While using it, something "gets under her beautiful skin". It manifests as a boil, which gets progressively redder and more inflamed. Finally it swells to capacity, and spiders start emerging from the boil's interior.

Release

Controversy
The Believers was shown to have influenced the cult established by Adolfo Constanzo and supported by Sara Aldrete in Matamoros, Mexico. The cult was based on Palo Mayombe, an Afro-Cuban religion similar to Santería.

Critical response

On review aggregator Rotten Tomatoes, The Believers holds an approval rating of 35%, based on 20 reviews, and an average rating of 4.8/10.

Roger Ebert gave the film one and a half stars out of 4, denouncing the film as "an awesomely silly, tasteless, and half-witted movie." Dennis Schwartz' from Ozus' World Movie Reviews awarded the film a grade C+, calling the film "muddled", and criticized the film's cheap scares, writing, and lack of a believable storyline.

However, not all reviews of the film were negative.
Hal Hinson from The Washington Post gave the film a mostly positive review, writing, "The Believers is a bizarre, occult thriller about the implications of religious faith. And, though it doesn't expand upon its shock tactics as much as it would like to or make its theological points, the movie's dread atmosphere begins to seep into your head." Author and film critic Leonard Maltin awarded the film 2.5 out of 5 stars, calling it "Gripping", and "genuinely frightening". Brett Gallman from Oh, the Horror praised the film, writing, "While The Believers feels familiar on a surface level, its use of Santeria mythology and Schlesinger's deft blend of suspense and graphic shocks provide enough flavor to separate it from the flock."

References

Sources

External links
 
 
 
 

1987 films
1987 horror films
1980s horror thriller films
American horror thriller films
American serial killer films
American supernatural horror films
1980s English-language films
Films directed by John Schlesinger
Films set in Minnesota
Films set in New York City
American neo-noir films
Films about cults
Films based on American horror novels
Occult detective fiction
Orion Pictures films
Religious horror films
Crime horror films
Works about Santería
Films with screenplays by Mark Frost
American supernatural thriller films
Films scored by J. Peter Robinson
Films about human sacrifice
1980s American films